The Socialistiska Partiet was a Swedish Trotskyist political party, the Swedish section of the Fourth International.

History
The party was formed at a congress in 1971, through the merger of the Revolutionary Marxists (RM) and the Bolshevik Group (BG). Initially it was called League of Revolutionary Marxists (RMF). One section of RM did not agree with the formation of RM and formed the Communist Working Groups (KAG). KAG would later reconcile with RMF, merging into it in 1972.

At the fifth party congress, held in 1975, the name was changed to Communist Workers League (Kommunistiska Arbetarförbundet). In 1982, the party adopted its current name.

In the early 1990s, the party suffered a small split that went on to form the Swedish section of the Pathfinder tendency. In 1994, a smaller group left the SP to form a Swedish section of what is now the League for the Fifth International, Arbetarmakt.

The party publishes the weekly paper Internationalen. It is currently not represented in local office.

As of 2019, the party has been reorganized from a political party into an ideological organization, and calls for its members to vote for the Left Party.

During the 2023 invasion of the Brazilian Congress the party expressed solidarity with President of Brazil Luiz Inácio Lula da Silva.

References

External links
http://www.socialistiskapartiet.se
http://www.internationalen.se

1971 establishments in Sweden
Communist parties in Sweden
Fourth International (post-reunification)
Political parties established in 1971
Trotskyist organizations in Sweden
Defunct political parties in Sweden